Natrium is the Latin name of sodium. It may also refer to:

 Chrysler Natrium, a hydrogen fuel cell vehicle
 Natrium, West Virginia
 Natrium reactor, a nuclear reactor design by TerraPower